The 2007–08 Kentucky Wildcats men's basketball team represented the University of Kentucky in the college basketball season of 2007–08. The team's head coach was Billy Gillispie. It was his 1st year as Kentucky's head coach. The Wildcats played their home games at Rupp Arena in Lexington, Kentucky. The highlights of the season were the unranked Wildcats upsetting the #3 ranked Tennessee Volunteers 72–66, and pushing the then ranked #1 Vols to the final seconds in a 63–60 loss at Tennessee.

Roster

2007 signees

2007–08 Schedule and Results

|-
!colspan=9 style="background:#273BE2; color:#FFFFFF;"| Non-conference regular season

|-
!colspan=9 style="background:#273BE2; color:#FFFFFF;"| SEC Regular Season

|-
!colspan=9 style="background:#273BE2;"| 2008 SEC Tournament

|-
!colspan=9 style="background:#273BE2;"| 2008 NCAA Tournament

Class of 2008 Commitments/Signees

References

Kentucky Wildcats men's basketball seasons
Kentucky
Kentucky
Kentucky Wildcats
Kentucky Wildcats